The Second Narrows Rail Bridge is a vertical-lift railway bridge that crosses the Burrard Inlet and connects Vancouver with the North Shore. The bridge's south end connects directly to the Thornton Tunnel, which connects it to the main Canadian rail network. As the name suggests, it is located at the second narrowing of the Burrard Inlet.

History

Background

During the Klondike Gold Rush, there were schemes to build a railway from Vancouver to the Dawson gold fields. The first stage in this would be to bridge Burrard Inlet and then build a railway north. John Hendry floated the Vancouver, Westminster, and Yukon Railway which built a line from Ladner to New Westminster and then to Vancouver via Burnaby Lake. This line was paired with the Great Northern Railway who also wanted trackage into Vancouver.

In the process, various other railroads all became involved in the bridging scheme: the Canadian Northern Railway, Milwaukee Road, and the Pacific Great Eastern Railway. The bridge itself would be owned by the Federal Government as they had control of harbours and shipping, and would lease access to the railways as they did with the rail bridge in New Westminster. One of the main reasons was that there was very little space on the south shore for wharves, thus railways wanted to develop the North Shore as the south side was occupied by another railway, the Canadian Pacific. A company was floated, the Burrard Inlet Bridge and Tunnel Company, and contracts were issued to span the tidal bore. At one point, a causeway was planned to dam the narrows and create bridges and wharves that way.

World War I intervened, as did the bankruptcy of all the interested railways. With it went dreams of the bridge and rails up Indian Arm, the Capilano valley, or via Howe Sound. However, the predecessor railways did sign contracts to build
a bridge and a new Hotel Vancouver. Only after the war with huge increase in funding to improve harbours around the British Empire, partly due to problems associated with wartime shipping, did funds appear for the completion of the 1925 bridge. And so the north shore port became an amalgam of operations with Canadian National, Pacific Great Eastern and Harbour and Wharves Commission all using the bridge when it was not out of service. North Vancouver ferries operated at this time as well.

The essential wartime shipyards in North Vancouver underscored the need for reliable industrial access. Further, the expansion of Lynnterm, Wheat elevators, coal and the sulphur port in the 1960s indicated the growing use of the North Shore.

Original bridge (1925)

Northern Construction Co & J.W. Stewart Ltd built the first bridge to connect Vancouver with the North Shore over the tidal bore of the narrows. The attached vehicle deck opened to road traffic in 1925 and the main structure to trains a year later. After being hit by a number of ships and being out of service for four years, the provincial government bought the bridge in 1933 and installed a lift section of the deck.

In 1960, a new much larger and higher 6-lane Second Narrows Bridge with a  span was completed alongside the original bridge, and the original bridge was converted exclusively for rail use. In 1994, the new road bridge was renamed the Ironworkers Memorial Second Narrows Crossing in honour of the ironworkers who died in accidents while building it. However, the new bridge is still commonly referred to as the Second Narrows Bridge.

Second bridge (1968)

In 1968, the original 1926 railbridge was replaced by CN Rail with a larger, higher lift bridge. A bridgetender activates cables and counterweights to raise the span. Unless moving a train across Burrard Inlet, the lift section is always in the up position to allow ships to go underneath.

The vertical lift section of the Second Narrows Railway Bridge provides  clear navigation width between rubbing fenders.

Chronology of the bridges 

 1902: The V. W. and Y Railway is completed to Burnaby. A bridge is planned.
 1910: Bridge plans by the Burrard Inlet Bridge and Tunnel Company are proposed.
 1912: Land speculation happens on the North Shore, subject to completion of a bridge.
 1914: A railway to Deep Cove and Port Moody is planned.
 1915: Stock market collapses; P. G. E. Railway goes bankrupt.
 1916: A causeway is planned; Canadian Northern goes bankrupt.
 1925: A smaller, lower bridge than originally envisioned is completed.
 1926: Trains begin using the bridge.
 1927: The freighter , carrying large cargo of lumber, hits the bridge on March 10, causing almost $8,000 worth of damage.
 1928: Hit by freighter .
 1930: The freighter Losmar hits the south span.
 1930: On September 13, the barge Pacific Gatherer becomes wedged under the bridge's fixed centre span. The tide rises, pushing the barge up under the span, knocking it off its supports. The span hangs off one side before suddenly breaking free and sinking into the depths of Burrard Inlet. Lawsuits and the bankruptcy of the Bridge company delay any attempt at repairs. The bridge remains closed for four years.
 1933: The bridge is sold to the provincial government and repairs begin.
 1934: The bridge reopens, with the bascule replaced by a centre lift span.
 1963: The bridge is closed to highway traffic and sold to the CNR for $1.
 1968: A new, larger lift bridge is built immediately to the east of the 1926 bridge.
 1969: The Thornton Tunnel is dug for CN trains to connect with the rail line at Willingdon.
 1970: The old 1926 bridge is removed, as are its cement piers.
 1979: In October, the Japanese freighter Japan Erica, carrying logs, collides with the bridge in a heavy fog, knocking a section of the bridge just north of the lift span into the water. The bridge is closed until March 4, 1980.

See also 
 List of bridges in Canada
 Ironworkers Memorial Second Narrows Crossing

References

External links 

A Short History of the Second Narrows Bridge
Satellite image of the Ironworkers Memorial Second Narrows Crossing and Second Narrows Bridge
1979 collision description and photos in Canadian Rail No. 344, 1980

Bridges in Greater Vancouver
Bridges completed in 1925
Bridges completed in 1968
Buildings and structures in Vancouver
Canadian National Railway bridges in Canada
Transport in North Vancouver (district municipality)
Railway bridges in British Columbia
Vertical lift bridges in Canada